Grace Chatto (born 10 December 1985) is an English musician and singer who is the cellist, backing vocalist and occasional main vocalist, for the electronic music band Clean Bandit.

Education 
Chatto attended Latymer School and Westminster School, as well as the Royal Academy of Music. She studied Modern Languages at Jesus College, Cambridge, where she met founding band members Jack Patterson and Neil Amin-Smith, with whom she played in a string quartet. Chatto speaks Russian fluently.

Awards and achievements 
Clean Bandit's 2010 single "Mozart's House" reached number 17 on the UK Singles Chart when re-released in 2013. Chatto held a position teaching cello at a school when it was first released, and her appearance in the music video – in which she appeared in her underwear with a violin obstructing her chest – prompted her to be fired after a parent complained. In January 2014, they scored their first UK chart topping single with "Rather Be", a collaboration with Jess Glynne, featuring elements of both classical and dance music. The song also reached number 10 on the US Billboard Hot 100.

Together with the other members of Clean Bandit, Jack Patterson and Luke Patterson, she has won a Grammy Award for Best Dance Recording 2015 for the track "Rather Be" and was nominated for two Brit Awards in 2015 and 2017.

Chatto directed the video for Clean Bandit's 2016 single "Rockabye", which features rapper Sean Paul and singer Anne-Marie, and became their second number-one hit in the UK, becoming the Christmas number one single for 2016 in its seventh consecutive week at number-one. Chatto also directed the video for Clean Bandit's single Symphony in March 2017, which contained an entire orchestra, with Clean Bandit members playing amongst them with Zara Larsson on lead vocals.

Other projects 

Chatto and Jack Patterson formed their own film production company, Cleanfilm, to make music videos for themselves and other artists. Chatto has produced and directed videos with Jack Patterson since the band's inception.

Chatto, with her father, formed a band of singing cellists called the Massive Violins, with whom she still performs.

On 13 November 2020, Chatto was featured on "Stop Crying Your Heart Out" as part of the BBC Radio 2's Allstars' Children in Need charity single. The single debuted at number 7 on the Official UK Singles Chart and number 1 on both the Official UK Singles Sales Chart and the Official UK Singles Download Chart.

References

1985 births
People educated at Latymer Upper School
Alumni of Jesus College, Cambridge
English cellists
People educated at Westminster School, London
English electronic musicians
English women singers
English songwriters
English women in electronic music
Grammy Award winners
Living people
Musicians from London
Chatto family
21st-century cellists